Pertusaria huneckiana is a species of saxicolous (rock-dwelling), crustose lichen in the family Pertusariaceae. Found in Mediterranean Europe, it was formally described as a new species in 1993 by Guido Benno Feige and H. Thorsten Lumbsch. The type specimen was collected from sandstone in the Balearic Islands. The lichen contains thiophaninic acid and norstictic acid, which are lichen products that can be detected with chemical analysis. Its ascospores are 85–110 μm long. The species epithet huneckiana honours chemist and lichenologist Siegfried Huneck.

See also
List of Pertusaria species

References

huneckiana
Lichen species
Lichens described in 1993
Taxa named by Helge Thorsten Lumbsch
Lichens of Southeastern Europe